Barry Stuart Sternlicht (born November 27, 1960) is an American billionaire and the co-founder (with Bob Faith), chairman, and CEO of Starwood Capital Group, an investment fund with over $60 billion in assets under management. He is also chairman of Starwood Property Trust. He is the co-founder of Starwood and served as its CEO from 1995 to 2005. As of January 2022, his net worth was estimated at $4.3 billion.

Sternlicht is on the board of directors of the Estée Lauder Companies Baccarat Crystal, Robin Hood Foundation Dreamland Community Theatre, the Juvenile Diabetes Research Foundation’s National Leadership Advocacy Program, and the Business Committee for the Arts. He previously serves on the boards of directors of the Pension Real Estate Association and the Real Estate Roundtable, and is a past trustee of his alma mater, Brown University.

Sternlicht's style has been described as "intense and impetuous."

Early life
Sternlicht was born in New York City in 1960 and grew up in Stamford, Connecticut. His father, Maurycy “Mark” Sternlicht, was a plant manager and a survivor of The Holocaust from Poland. His mother, Harriet, was from New York and worked as a biology teacher and stockbroker. In 1982, he graduated magna cum laude, from Brown University. He then worked as an arbitrage trader on Wall Street. In 1986, he received a Master of Business Administration from Harvard Business School.

Career
After graduation, he went to work for JMB Realty, a real estate investment company in Chicago. In 1989, at the start of the savings and loan crisis and the early 1990s recession, he was laid off.

In 1991, at the age of 31, with Bob Faith, Sternlicht launched Starwood Capital Group to buy apartment buildings that were being sold by the Resolution Trust Corporation, created by the federal government to hold and liquidate the real estate assets owned by failed banks after the savings and loan crisis. Sternlicht raised $20 million from the families of William Bernard Ziff Jr. and Carter Burden of New York to fund these purchases.

In 1993, Sternlicht contributed the apartment portfolio to Sam Zell's Equity Residential in exchange for a 20% stake in the company.

In 1994, when Sternlicht was 36, his company purchased Westin Hotels & Resorts in a $561 million transaction in partnership with Goldman Sachs, Sternlicht's innovations included W Hotels and the Westin Heavenly Bed. The bed was modeled after the bed in Sternlicht's home.

In January 1995, Sternlicht purchased Hotel Investors Trust, an almost-bankrupt real estate investment trust, and took over as CEO.

In 1997, Sternlicht's company acquired Sheraton Hotels and Resorts in a $13.3 billion transaction, topping a bid by Hilton Worldwide.

Barry Sternlicht also makes venture investments out of his family office, JAWS Capital - which has also engaged in three separate SPACs.

Awards
In 1998, Sternlicht received the Golden Plate Award of the American Academy of Achievement.

In 2004, Sternlicht was named "America’s Best Lodging CEO" by Institutional Investor magazine.

In 2005, Sternlicht was inducted into the Interior Design Magazine Hall of Fame.

In 2010, Commercial Property Executive named Sternlicht "Executive of the Year" and "Investor of the Year".

Personal life
Barry Sternlicht was married to Mimi (née Reichert) Sternlicht, whom he met at Brown University, but they separated in 2016. They have 3 children together, including equestrian Adrienne Sternlicht.

In 2016, Sternlicht moved to Florida.

Wealth
According to Forbes, Sternlicht has an estimated net worth of $4.4 billion and is ranked 260th on the Forbes 400.

Philanthropy
In 2007, Sternlicht funded a $1 million grant to the Harvard Stem Cell Institute to support research for a cure for diabetes.

Political contributions
Sternlicht has historically identified as a Republican, though more recently has characterized his political views as independent.

Sternlicht is a "self-described friend and golf partner" of Donald Trump but was disappointed Trump did not move to the political center as President of the United States. In 2008, Sternlicht donated first to the Hillary Clinton 2008 presidential primary campaign and then to the Barack Obama 2008 presidential campaign. In 2012, Sternlicht contributed $70,800 to the presidential campaign of Mitt Romney. In 2016, Sternlicht contributed $125,000 to Right to Rise, the political action committee created to support the Jeb Bush 2016 presidential campaign. Sternlicht also contributed $1,000 to oppose 2008 California Proposition 8, which would have banned same-sex marriage in California.

When asked if he identified as a Republican in a 2020 interview, Sternlicht commented "What are you, crazy? I’m an independent. I’m socially liberal and fiscally conservative. I think capitalism is the best form of government, but I think it needs to be regulated."

References

American billionaires
American chief executives of travel and tourism industry companies
American people of Polish-Jewish descent
American philanthropists
American real estate businesspeople
Brown University alumni
Harvard Business School alumni
Jewish American philanthropists
Living people
1960 births
21st-century American Jews